Cofitachequi was a paramount chiefdom founded about 1300 AD and encountered by the Hernando de Soto expedition in South Carolina in April 1540.  Cofitachequi was later visited by Juan Pardo during his two expeditions (1566–1568) and by Henry Woodward in 1670.  Cofitachequi ceased to exist as a political entity prior to 1701.

The town and ceremonial center of Cofitachequi was located near the present-day city of Camden, South Carolina.  Cofitachequi ruled a large number of towns in an area of several thousand square miles in the northeastern part of South Carolina.  It was the easternmost manifestation of the Mississippian culture that extended over much of the southern part of the future United States.

Location

The hunt for the location of Cofitachequi has been stimulated by the century-old search for the route of Hernando de Soto in his 4-year traverse of much of the southeastern United States. The Spaniards described Cofitachequi as about 10 days travel eastward from Ocute through an uninhabited wilderness. Cofitachequi was situated on a large river about 100 miles from the coast. Several other towns were nearby, including Talimeco, said to be about 3 miles distant and situated on a bluff overlooking "the gorge of the river."  The description of Talimeco indicates that Cofitachequi was near the Atlantic Seaboard fall line where Atlantic coast rivers drop sharply from the hilly piedmont area to the flatlands extending inland from the coast.  Another town, called Ilapi or Ilasi, was located on a second river to the east.  Cofitachequi was a large town in addition to being a ceremonial center.  The size of Cofitachequi is indicated by the fact that de Soto during his occupation took over about one-half the houses in the town to house his 600 men (and, in addition, to house probably several hundred retainers and slaves).  Thus, archaeological ruins of Cofitachequi should be extensive.

The archaeological site which most closely corresponds to the description of Cofitachequi is believed, by most scholars, to be the Mulberry Site at the junction of Pine Tree Creek and the Wateree River, about two miles south of present-day Camden and just below the fall line.  The Mulberry site consists of three surviving mounds in an area of more than eight acres (3.5 ha).  The Mulberry site is one of eight surviving mound centers along an 18 mile (30 km) stretch of the Wateree River both north and south of Camden.  This was the heartland of the chiefdom of Cofitachequi.

First contacts

Cofitachequi may have come to the attention of the Spanish as early as 1521 when two Spanish ships explored the South Carolina coast.  At present day Winyah Bay, near the city of Georgetown, they captured and enslaved about sixty people who said they were subjects of a ruler called Datha or Duhare.  Datha may have been the ruler of Cofitachequi, some 90 miles inland from Georgetown. One of the captives, called Francisco Chicora, learned Spanish and visited Spain.  He described Datha to Peter Martyr as "white", tall, carried on the shoulders of his subjects, and ruling a large region of towns featuring earthen mounds upon which religious ceremonies were held.  Large quantities of pearls and jewels, Chicora said, could be found at Xapira, a town or chiefdom near Datha.

In 1526, inspired by these stories, Lucas Vázquez de Ayllón led 600 people to establish a colony that would exploit the supposed riches of Datha.  At Winyah Bay, one of his ships was wrecked and Chicora and others escaped from the Spanish.  Ayllon established a settlement near Sapelo Sound in present day Georgia, but he died and the colony was abandoned after three months, the 150 survivors returning to the Caribbean. Ayllón's colony was probably the source of items of European manufacture later discovered by De Soto in Cofitachequi.

De Soto and the "Lady of Cofitachequi"

While de Soto was among the Apalachee people in Florida, a captured boy called Perico told him of a province named "Yupaha" ruled by a woman and rich in gold. De Soto decided to strike out for Yupaha—which turned out to be an alternative name of Cofitachequi. In the Spring of 1540, de Soto and his army traveled north through central Georgia to the Oconee River town of Cofaqui in present day Greene County, Georgia, in the chiefdom of Ocute. The people of Calfaqui were aware of Cofitachequi but did not know its exact location. De Soto impressed 700 people from Colfaqui and struck off eastward into a large uninhabited wilderness separating the chiefdoms of Ocute and Cofitachequi. He reached Cofitachequi only after two weeks.

De Soto was met by a woman the chroniclers call the Lady of Cofitachequi who was carried from the town to the river's edge on a litter that was covered with a delicate white cloth. They considered her the leader of the villages. Indeed, she ruled over thousands of subjects as a "paramount chief." After spending several weeks in the village, the Spaniards took the "Lady" as a captive and hostage and headed to the next chiefdom to the northwest, Joara. She eventually escaped.  The Spaniards found no gold in Cofitachequi, nor anywhere in its vicinity.

Later expeditions

Juan Pardo with a force of 125 Spaniards visited Cofitachequi (which he also called Canosi) on two expeditions between 1566 and 1568.  Juan de Torres led 10 Spanish soldiers and 60 native allies to Cofitachequi on two expeditions in 1627–1628.  He was "well entertained by the chief who is highly respected by the rest of the chiefs, who all obey him and acknowledge vassalage to him."  In 1670, an Englishman, Henry Woodward, journeyed inland from Charlestown, South Carolina to Cofitachequi.  He called the chief "the emperor" and said the town counted 1,000 bowmen.  The "emperor" of Cofitachequi visited Charleston in 1670 and 1672.  Sometime after that, Cofitachequi was abandoned.  By 1701, when John Lawson passed through, the area of Cofitachequi was inhabited only by small settlements of the Congaree.

Description

Cofitachequi was typical of several Mississippian paramount chiefdoms in the American south at the time of de Soto: a town at the center of the chiefdom, often containing ceremonial mounds and temples and controlling a large number of smaller settlements with the influence of the center extending out many miles.  The chiefdoms were often bordered by an  uninhabited area as a buffer zone between warring chiefdoms.  The basis of the economy was maize agriculture.  Cofitachequi was perhaps the easternmost of the Mississippian chiefdoms and one of the latest, founded after 1300 A.D.

There were three levels of political power at Cofitachequi. The orata was a lesser noble, seemingly in charge a village or a few villages.  The mico was a great noble who occupied one of the administrative centers of the chiefdom, presumably complete with a mound. Above these was the gran cacique, the great chief or paramount chief. Lesser officials were ynihas, or ynanaes, who were chiefs' assistants, perhaps comparable to magistrates. The yatikas were interpreters and spokesmen. The culture of Cofitachequi was a variant of the Lamar culture that was broadly comparable to the people of Ocute in Georgia.

The people of Cofitachequi are often described as Muskogean speakers, but that is not certain. The area of influence of Cofitachequi probably included Siouan and Iroquoian (Cherokee) speakers.  Linguist Blair A. Rudes analyzed sixteenth-century placenames from Cofitachique/Canos to Xualla.  Rudes used the term Cofitachique in a broad sense to include all the towns that are supposed to have been part of the Cofitacheque chiefdom, or that were allies.  He shows that previous attempts to use recorded placenames to identify the sixteenth-century inhabitants with eighteenth-century tribes have been flawed:

"Previous research on the etymology of place names from Cofitchequi might best be characterized as long on speculation and short on rigor.  While etymologies have been proposed for many of the place names, few stand up to careful review.  Unfortunately, the weaknesses in prior analyses have not prevented researchers from using the results to draw sweeping conclusions about the ethnic and linguistic composition of the area. Rudes goes on to suggest that while Booker, Hudson, and Rankin follow John Swanton's proposal that “Muskogean-speaking people were a major constituent of the population”, a careful analysis of the evidence does not support that conclusion."  
Though Hudson et al. put forward several place names in the Cofitachequi orbit as Muskogean, Rudes finds only one to be of Muskogean origin, that of Talimeco/Talomeco.  But this name, he argues, is likely not an indigenous place name, but a descriptive name given by a Muskogean speaking interpreter.  The name simply means a town wherein a chief resides or chiefs’ town.  Therefore, of all the sixteenth-century placenames recorded for towns from Cofitachequi to Guasili, Rudes concludes that none, based on linguistic evidence, appear to have been Muskogean towns.

Some scholars speculate that Cofitachequi politically controlled a cluster of towns around present-day Camden, an 80 to 100 mile (130–160 km) stretch of the Wateree River and vicinity in South Carolina, and a similar portion of the Pee Dee River. More distant towns in the piedmont of North Carolina and the coastal plains of South Carolina may have paid tribute to Cofitachequi, but retained a measure of freedom. The scholar Charles Hudson listed more than 30 towns that might have been under the control of Cofitachequi, indicating a population of the chiefdom of several tens of thousands of people.<ref>Hudson, The Juan Pardo Expeditions, pp 68–70, 75, 83</ref>

The chiefdom of Cofitachequi may have been in decline when visited by de Soto in 1540 and Pardo in 1566, much of the decline occasioned by the brutal passage of de Soto and his army.  De Soto found little maize in the town to feed his soldiers and saw evidence that an epidemic, possibly European in origin, had wiped out the population of several settlements. Nevertheless, the fame and some of the influence of Cofitachequi endured another 100 years until the time of Woodward's visit.  Why Cofitachequi disappeared, replaced by smaller communities, is unknown although the ravages of European diseases were probably a factor. The surviving Muskogean speaking inhabitants of Cofitachequi were likely absorbed by the Siouan people inhabiting the area in 1701 when Lawson visited.

Notes

References

 Hudson, Charles M., Knights of Spain, Warriors of the Sun: Hernando De Soto and the South's Ancient Chiefdoms'', University of Georgia Press, 1997. 
 Patricia Galloway, editor, The Hernando de Soto Expedition, Lincoln: University of Nebraska Press, 1997.

Other sites and personages encountered by the De Soto Expedition

 List of sites and peoples visited by the Hernando de Soto Expedition
 Mississippian culture
 Southeastern Ceremonial Complex

External links

South Appalachian Mississippian culture
Pre-statehood history of South Carolina
Native American populated places
Former Native American populated places in the United States
Native American history
Indigenous culture of the Southeastern Woodlands